Two Burrows is a hamlet near Blackwater in Cornwall, England, United Kingdom.

References

Hamlets in Cornwall